The positions of the Baptist churches about homosexuality are varied. They range from liberal to fundamentalist or moderate Conservative and neutral.

Basic beliefs

There is a diversity of views of Baptist denominations on homosexuality. Most denominations remain conservative, believing in what they describe as 'traditional' marriage between one man and one woman.Some denominations allow local and autonomous congregations to determine their own regional policies. Some Baptist denominations supports same-sex marriage.

Denominational positions
Several organizations and denominations of Baptist churches have issued statements and resolutions about homosexuality.

International denomination

Conservative position
The vast majority of Baptist denominations around the world hold a conservative view on homosexuality, like those gathered in the Baptist World Alliance.

Liberal position
The Association of Welcoming and Affirming Baptists is made up of Baptist churches, organizations, and individuals who welcome and affirm people regardless of sexual orientation or gender identity, and advocate for lesbian, gay, bisexual and transgender inclusion within Baptist faith communities.

American denomination

Neutral position
Some Baptist denominations in the United States do not have official beliefs about marriage in a confession of faith and invoke congregationalism to leave the choice to each church to decide.  

 The American Baptist Churches USA, released a statement following the legalization of same-sex marriage by the Supreme Court of the United States saying that the denomination will "respect and will continue to respect congregational freedom on this issue." While the General Board had previously voted to define marriage as "between one man and one woman," the denomination did not adopt the policy statement. The ABCUSA "allows individual congregations to decide whether to ordain LGBT clergy or perform same-sex marriages" and does not have a denomination-wide policy.
 The Progressive National Baptist Convention (USA), does not have an official position and, like many Baptist denominations, allows individual congregations to determine their own view. As a result, some congregations have performed blessings and marriages for same-sex couples.
 The Cooperative Baptist Fellowship (USA), does not have an official policy on homosexuality (or other social issues). It allows individual organizations and churches to support or fund gay rights advocacy if they so choose, but it is not required or prohibited. In 2018, the Affirming Network for full LGBTQ inclusion and affirmation was founded. 
 The National Baptist Convention, USA, passed a resolution in 2012 affirming that marriage is a union between a man and a woman, but mentioned that it leaves autonomy to each church to decide on the subject.

Liberal position
Some Baptist denominations supports same-sex marriage. 
 The Alliance of Baptists (USA).  
 The Aliança de Batistas do Brasil.  
 The Fraternidad de Iglesias Bautistas de Cuba.

See also

 Status of same-sex marriage

References